Fantastic Contraption may refer to:
Fantastic Contraption (2008 video game)
Fantastic Contraption (2016 video game)